There are fifteen universities based in Scotland, the Open University, and three other institutions of higher education.

The first university in Scotland was St John's College, St Andrews, founded in 1418. St Salvator's College was added to St. Andrews in 1450. The other great bishoprics followed, with the University of Glasgow being founded in 1451 and King's College, Aberdeen in 1495. St Leonard's College was founded in Aberdeen in 1511 and St John's College was re-founded in 1538 as St Mary's College, St Andrews. Public lectures that were established in Edinburgh in the 1540s would eventually become the University of Edinburgh in 1582. In 1641, the two colleges at Aberdeen were united by decree of Charles I (r. 1625–49), to form the ‘King Charles University of Aberdeen’. They were demerged after the Restoration in 1661. In 1747 St Leonard's College in St Andrews was merged into St Salvator's College to form the United College of St Salvator and St Leonard. A new college of St Andrews was opened in Dundee in 1883, though initially an independent institution. The two colleges at Aberdeen were considered too small to be viable and they were restructured as the University of Aberdeen in 1860. Marischal College was rebuilt in the Gothic style from 1900. The University of Edinburgh was taken out of the care of the city and established on a similar basis to the other ancient universities.

After the Robbins Report of 1963 there was a rapid expansion in higher education in Scotland. By the end of the decade the number of Scottish Universities had doubled. New universities included the University of Dundee, Strathclyde, Heriot-Watt, and Stirling. From the 1970s the government preferred to expand higher education in the non-university sector and by the late 1980s roughly half of students in higher education were in colleges. In 1992, the distinction between universities and polytechnic colleges/Central institutions was removed. This created new universities at Abertay, Glasgow Caledonian, Napier, Paisley and Robert Gordon. in 2001 the University of the Highlands and Islands was created by a federation of 13 colleges and research institutions in the Highlands and Islands and gained full university status in 2011.

See also
Armorial of UK universities
Carnegie Trust for the Universities of Scotland
Education in Scotland
List of further education colleges in Scotland
Universities in Scotland

References

Scotland
Universities
Uni

Universities